
Gmina Bystrzyca Kłodzka is an urban-rural gmina (administrative district) in Kłodzko County, Lower Silesian Voivodeship, in south-western Poland.

Neighbouring gminas
Gmina Bystrzyca Kłodzka is bordered by the town of Polanica-Zdrój and the gminas of Kłodzko, Lądek-Zdrój, Międzylesie, Stronie Śląskie and Szczytna. It also borders the Czech Republic.

Villages
Apart from the town of Bystrzyca Kłodzka, the gmina contains the villages of Długopole Dolne, Długopole-Zdrój, Gorzanów, Huta, Idzików, Kamienna, Lasówka, Marcinków, Marianówka, Międzygórze, Mielnik, Młoty, Mostowice, Nowa Bystrzyca, Nowa Łomnica, Nowy Waliszów, Paszków, Piotrowice, Pławnica, Pokrzywno, Poniatów, Ponikwa, Poręba, Rudawa, Spalona, Stara Bystrzyca, Stara Łomnica, Starkówek, Stary Waliszów, Szczawina, Szklarka, Szklary, Topolice, Wilkanów, Wójtowice, Wyszki, Zabłocie and Zalesie.

Twin towns – sister cities

Gmina Bystrzyca Kłodzka is twinned with:

 Amberg, Germany
 Kaźmierz, Poland
 Massa Martana, Italy
 Orlické Záhoří, Czech Republic
 Ústí nad Orlicí, Czech Republic
 Zdobnice, Czech Republic

References

Bystrzyca Klodzka
Kłodzko County